Events in the year 1822 in India.

Events
 July 1 – Mumbai Samachar, a Gujarati daily newspaper, is established

Law

References 

 
India
Years of the 19th century in India